Mahāpajāpatī Gotamī (Pali;  Sanskrit: महाप्रजापती गौतमी, Mahāprajāpatī Gautamī) or Pajapati was the foster-mother, step-mother and maternal aunt (mother's sister) of the Buddha. In Buddhist tradition, she was the first woman to seek ordination for women, which she did from Gautama Buddha directly, and she became the first bhikkhuni (Buddhist nun).

Biography
Tradition says Maya and Mahāpajāpatī Gotamī were Koliyan princess and sisters of Suppabuddha. Mahāpajāpatī was both the Buddha's maternal aunt and adoptive mother, raising him after her sister Maya, the Buddha's birth mother, died. She raised Siddhartha as if he were her own child. Mahāpajāpatī died at the age of 120.

"The story of the parinirvāṇa of Mahāprajāpatī Gautamī and her five hundred bhikṣuṇī companions was popular and widely transmitted and existed in multiple versions." It is recorded in the various surviving Vinaya traditions, including the Pali Canon and Sarvastivada and Mulasarvastivada versions.

An eminent Therī, Mahāpajāpatī was born at Devdaha as the younger sister of Māyā. Mahāpajāpatī was so called because, at her birth, augurs prophesied that she would have a large following. Both sisters married King Suddhodhana, leader of the Śākya. When Māyā died seven days after the birth of the Bodhisatta (the "Buddha-to-be"), Pajāpati looked after the Bodhisatta and nursed him. She raised the Buddha and had her own children, Siddhartha's half-sister Sundari Nanda and half-brother Nanda. Prince Siddhartha, Prince Nanda, Princess Sundari Nanda, the grandson Rāhula and her daughter-in-law Yaśodharā all were equally loved and treated by Mahāpajāpatī Gotamī.

Ordination of the first woman

When King Suddhodhana died, Mahapajapati Gotami decided to attain ordination. Mahapajapati Gotami went to the Buddha and asked to be ordained into the Sangha. The Buddha refused and went on to Vesāli. Undaunted, Gotami cut off her hair and donned yellow robes and with many Sakyan ladies followed the Buddha to Vesāli on foot. Upon arrival, she repeated her request to be ordained. Ananda, one of the principal disciples and an attendant of the Buddha, met her and offered to intercede with the Buddha on her behalf.

Gotami agreed to accept the Eight Garudhammas and was accorded the status of the first bhikkhuni. Subsequent women had to undergo full ordination to become nuns.

Mahāyāna

Lotus Sutra
In the Lotus Sutra, the Buddha bestows a prophecy upon Mahāprajāpatī that in the distant future, she will become a buddha named "Sarvasattvapriyadarśana."

References

Bibliography
Analayo (2011). Mahapajapati's going forth in the Madhyama agama, Journal of Buddhist Ethics 18, 268-317.
Anālayo, Bhikkhu (2016).The Going Forth of Mahāpajāpatī Gotamī in T 60, Journal of Buddhist Ethics 23, 1-31.
 Scott, Rachel M (2010). Buddhism, miraculous powers, and gender - rethinking the stories of Theravada nuns, Journal of the International Association of Buddhist Studies 33 (1-2), 489-511.

Walters, Jonathan S. (1994). “A Voice from the Silence: The Buddha's Mother's Story.” History of Religions 33, 350–379.
 Garling, Wendy (2016). Stars at Dawn: Forgotten Stories of Women in the Buddha's Life. Shambhala Publications. .
Garling, Wendy; H.H. the Fourteenth Dalai Lama (foreword) (2021). The Woman Who Raised the Buddha: The Extraordinary Life of Mahaprajapati. Shambhala Publications. .
 Roberts, Peter Alan (2018) The White Lotus of the Good Dharma, 84000: Translating the Words of the Buddha.

External links
Maha Pajapati (Gotami) Theri: A Mother's Blessing
Mahāpajāpatī Gotami

Foremost disciples of Gautama Buddha
Family of Gautama Buddha
Arhats
Indian Buddhists
Buddhist monasticism
Year of birth missing
Year of death missing
Buddhist nuns
Indian Buddhist nuns